Bellevalia is a genus of plants in the family Asparagaceae, subfamily Scilloideae. It was first described as a genus in 1808.

The approximately 65 species are found from the Mediterranean: Turkey (about 12 species) and Israel (12 species), to central Asia: Iran, Afghanistan and Pakistan (two species).

Description 
Bellevalia species are perennial herbaceous plants. As geophytes, they form bulbs with a membranous sheath ("tunic"). The simple, parallel-veined leaves are basal. Grape-like inflorescences grow terminally on smooth cylindrical flower stems. The numerous flowers are located in the axils of small, membranous bracts.  The hermaphroditic flowers are triple. The six identically shaped bracts are one-third to one-half their length and deformed tubular, bell-shaped or funnel-shaped in form. The color of the bracts ranges from white to cream to brown or more rarely from blue to purple.  The fruit capsule is triangular in cross section with winged edges. The seeds are more or less spherical, rarely elongated and glossy.

Taxonomy 

The genus Bellevalia was first described in 1808 by Philippe-Isidore Picot de Lapeyrouse. The genus name honors the French botanist Pierre Richer de Belleval (1564-1632). A synonym for Bellevalia is Strangweja Bertol. The homonym genus Bellevalia Roem. & Schult. is a synonym of the genus Richeria Vahl from the family Phyllanthaceae.

Some species formerly belonged to the genus Hyacinthus. The genus Bellevalia is placed in the tribe Hyacintheae in the subfamily Scilloideae within the family Asparagaceae.

Species 
According to the World Checklist of Selected Plant Families, there are 65 Bellevalia species:

Species formerly included
moved to Alrawia Althenia Hyacinthella Leopoldia Muscari Pseudomuscari

References

Bibliography 

 S. I. Ali: Flora of Pakistan. Volume 214: Hyacinthaceae. University of Karachi, Department of Botany, Karachi 2005, S. 2, Bellevalia online 
 GRIN
 Gustav Heynhold: Nomenclator botanicus hortensis: Oder, Alphabetische und synonymische Aufzählung der in den Gärten Europa's Cultivirten Gewächse, nebst Angabe ihres Autors, ihres Vaterlandes, ihrer Dauer und Cultur. Band 2. Arnoldische Buchhandlung, Dresden und Leipzig 1846, p. 64
 Cristian Brullo, Salvatore Brullo, S. Pasta: Bellevalia pelagica (Hyacinthaceae), a new species from the Islet of Lampione (Pelagian Archipelag, Sicily). In: Edinburgh Journal of Botany. vol. 66, No. 1, 2009, p. 65–75
 A. Jafari, A. A. Maassoumi: A New Species of Bellevalia (Liliaceae/Hyacinthaceae) from Iran. In: Edinburgh Journal of Botany. vol 65, No. 3, 2008, p. 469–473

External links 
 Flora of Israel
 Pacific Bulb Society
 International Bulb Society

Asparagaceae genera
Scilloideae